Sky Landscape I is an outdoor 1983 painted aluminum sculpture by Louise Nevelson, installed at Olympic Sculpture Park in Seattle, Washington.

See also

 Sky Landscape (1988), Washington, D.C.

References

External links
 

1983 sculptures
Aluminum sculptures in Washington (state)
Olympic Sculpture Park